A structured-light 3D scanner is a 3D scanning device for measuring the three-dimensional shape of an object using projected light patterns and a camera system. 

The light source from the scanner head projects a series of parallel patterns onto the scan target. When light projects onto the object's surface, the patterns become distorted. The cameras capture these images and send them to the 3D scanning software for processing.

Principle 

Projecting a narrow band of light onto a three-dimensionally shaped surface produces a line of illumination that appears distorted from other perspectives than that of the projector, and can be used for geometric reconstruction of the surface shape (light section).

A faster and more versatile method is the projection of patterns consisting of many stripes at once, or of arbitrary fringes, as this allows for the acquisition of a multitude of samples simultaneously.
Seen from different viewpoints, the pattern appears geometrically distorted due to the surface shape of the object.

Although many other variants of structured light projection are possible, patterns of parallel stripes are widely used. The picture shows the geometrical deformation of a single stripe projected onto a simple 3D surface. The displacement of the stripes allows for an exact retrieval of the 3D coordinates of any details on the object's surface.

Generation of light patterns 

Two major methods of stripe pattern generation have been established: Laser interference and projection.

The laser interference method works with two wide planar laser beam fronts. Their interference results in regular, equidistant line patterns. Different pattern sizes can be obtained by changing the angle between these beams. The method allows for the exact and easy generation of very fine patterns with unlimited depth of field. Disadvantages are high cost of implementation, difficulties providing the ideal beam geometry, and laser typical effects like speckle noise and the possible self interference with beam parts reflected from objects. Typically, there is no means of modulating individual stripes, such as with Gray codes.

The projection method uses incoherent light and basically works like a video projector. Patterns are usually generated by passing light through a digital spatial light modulator, typically based on one of the three currently most widespread digital projection technologies, transmissive liquid crystal, reflective liquid crystal on silicon (LCOS) or digital light processing (DLP; moving micro mirror) modulators, which have various comparative advantages and disadvantages for this application. Other methods of projection could be and have been used, however.

Patterns generated by digital display projectors have small discontinuities due to the pixel boundaries in the displays. Sufficiently small boundaries however can practically be neglected as they are evened out by the slightest defocus.

A typical measuring assembly consists of one projector and at least one camera. For many applications, two cameras on opposite sides of the projector have been established as useful.

Invisible (or imperceptible) structured light uses structured light without interfering with other computer vision tasks for which the projected pattern will be confusing. Example methods include the use of infrared light or of extremely high framerates alternating between two exact opposite patterns.

Calibration 

Geometric distortions by optics and perspective must be compensated by a calibration of the measuring equipment, using special calibration patterns and surfaces. A mathematical model is used for describing the imaging properties of projector and cameras. Essentially based on the simple geometric properties of a pinhole camera, the model also has to take into account the geometric distortions and optical aberration of projector and camera lenses. The parameters of the camera as well as its orientation in space can be determined by a series of calibration measurements, using photogrammetric bundle adjustment.

Analysis of stripe patterns 

There are several depth cues contained in the observed stripe patterns. The displacement of any single stripe can directly be converted into 3D coordinates. For this purpose, the individual stripe has to be identified, which can for example be accomplished by tracing or counting stripes (pattern recognition method). Another common method projects alternating stripe patterns, resulting in binary Gray code sequences identifying the number of each individual stripe hitting the object.
An important depth cue also results from the varying stripe widths along the object surface. Stripe width is a function of the steepness of a surface part, i.e. the first derivative of the elevation. Stripe frequency and phase deliver similar cues and can be analyzed by a Fourier transform. Finally, the wavelet transform has recently been discussed for the same purpose.

In many practical implementations, series of measurements combining pattern recognition, Gray codes and Fourier transform are obtained for a complete and unambiguous reconstruction of shapes.

Another method also belonging to the area of fringe projection has been demonstrated, utilizing the depth of field of the camera.

It is also possible to use projected patterns primarily as a means of structure insertion into scenes, for an essentially photogrammetric acquisition.

Precision and range 

The optical resolution of fringe projection methods depends on the width of the stripes used and their optical quality. It is also limited by the wavelength of light.

An extreme reduction of stripe width proves inefficient due to limitations in depth of field, camera resolution and display resolution. Therefore, the phase shift method has been widely established: A number of at least 3, typically about 10 exposures are taken with slightly shifted stripes. The first theoretical deductions of this method relied on stripes with a sine wave shaped intensity modulation, but the methods work with "rectangular" modulated stripes, as delivered from LCD or DLP displays as well. By phase shifting, surface detail of e.g. 1/10 the stripe pitch can be resolved.

Current optical stripe pattern profilometry hence allows for detail resolutions down to the wavelength of light, below 1 micrometer in practice or, with larger stripe patterns, to approx. 1/10 of the stripe width. Concerning level accuracy, interpolating over several pixels of the acquired camera image can yield a reliable height resolution and also accuracy, down to 1/50 pixel.

Arbitrarily large objects can be measured with accordingly large stripe patterns and setups. Practical applications are documented involving objects several meters in size.

Typical accuracy figures are:
 Shape of an object  large, to about 
 Radius of a blade edge of e.g. , to ±0.4 μm

Navigation 
As the method can measure shapes from only one perspective at a time, complete 3D shapes have to be combined from different measurements in different angles. This can be accomplished by attaching marker points to the object and combining perspectives afterwards by matching these markers. The process can be automated, by mounting the object on a motorized turntable or CNC positioning device. Markers can as well be applied on a positioning device instead of the object itself.

The 3D data gathered can be used to retrieve CAD (computer aided design) data and models from existing components (reverse engineering), hand formed samples or sculptures, natural objects or artifacts.

Challenges 

As with all optical methods, reflective or transparent surfaces raise difficulties. Reflections cause light to be reflected either away from the camera or right into its optics. In both cases, the dynamic range of the camera can be exceeded. Transparent or semi-transparent surfaces also cause major difficulties. In these cases, coating the surfaces with a thin opaque lacquer just for measuring purposes is a common practice. A recent method handles highly reflective and specular objects by inserting a 1-dimensional diffuser between the light source (e.g., projector) and the object to be scanned. Alternative optical techniques have been proposed for handling perfectly transparent and specular objects.

Double reflections and inter-reflections can cause the stripe pattern to be overlaid with unwanted light, entirely eliminating the chance for proper detection. Reflective cavities and concave objects are therefore difficult to handle. It is also hard to handle translucent materials, such as skin, marble, wax, plants and human tissue because of the phenomenon of sub-surface scattering. Recently, there has been an effort in the computer vision community to handle such optically complex scenes by re-designing the illumination patterns. These methods have shown promising 3D scanning results for traditionally difficult objects, such as highly specular metal concavities and translucent wax candles.

Speed 

Although several patterns have to be taken per picture in most structured light variants, high-speed implementations are available for a number of applications, for example:
 Inline precision inspection of components during the production process.
 Health care applications, such as live measuring of human body shapes or the micro structures of human skin.
Motion picture applications have been proposed, for example the acquisition of spatial scene data for three-dimensional television.

Applications 
 Industrial Optical Metrology Systems (ATOS) from GOM GmbH utilize Structured Light technology to achieve high accuracy and scalability in measurements. These systems feature self-monitoring for calibration status, transformation accuracy, environmental changes, and part movement to ensure high-quality measuring data.
 Google Project Tango SLAM (Simultaneous localization and mapping) using depth technologies, including Structured Light, Time of Flight, and Stereo. Time of Flight require the use of an infrared (IR) projector and IR sensor; Stereo does not.
 MainAxis srl produces a 3D Scanner utilizing an advanced patented technology that enables 3d scanning in full color and with an acquisition time of a few microseconds, used in medical and other applications.
 A technology by PrimeSense, used in an early version of Microsoft Kinect, used a pattern of projected infrared points to generate a dense 3D image. (Later on, the Microsoft Kinect switched to using a time-of-flight camera instead of structured light.)
 Occipital
 Structure Sensor uses a pattern of projected infrared points, calibrated to minimize distortion to generate a dense 3D image.
 Structure Core uses a stereo camera that matches against a random pattern of projected infrared points to generate a dense 3D image.
 Intel RealSense camera projects a series of infrared patterns to obtain the 3D structure.
 Face ID system works by projecting more than 30,000 infrared dots onto a face and producing a 3D facial map.
 VicoVR sensor uses a pattern of infrared points for skeletal tracking.
 Chiaro Technologies uses a single engineered pattern of infrared points called Symbolic Light to stream 3D point clouds for industrial applications
 Made to measure fashion retailing
 3D-Automated optical inspection
 Precision shape measurement for production control (e.g. turbine blades)
 Reverse engineering (obtaining precision CAD data from existing objects)
 Volume measurement (e.g. combustion chamber volume in motors)
 Classification of grinding materials and tools
 Precision structure measurement of ground surfaces
 Radius determination of cutting tool blades
 Precision measurement of planarity
 Documenting objects of cultural heritage
 Capturing environments for augmented reality gaming
 Skin surface measurement for cosmetics and medicine
 Body shape measurement
 Forensic science inspections
 Road pavement structure and roughness
 Wrinkle measurement on cloth and leather
 Structured Illumination Microscopy
 Measurement of topography of solar cells
 3D vision system enables DHL's e-fulfillment robot

Software 
 3DUNDERWORLD SLS – OPEN SOURCE
 DIY 3D scanner based on structured light and stereo vision in Python language
 SLStudio—Open Source Real Time Structured Light

See also 
 Depth map
 Kinect
 Laser Dynamic Range Imager
 Lidar
 Light stage
 Range imaging
 reflectance capture
 virtual cinematography

References

Sources 

 Fechteler, P., Eisert, P., Rurainsky, J.: Fast and High Resolution 3D Face Scanning Proc. of ICIP 2007
 Fechteler, P., Eisert, P.: Adaptive Color Classification for Structured Light Systems Proc. of CVPR 2008
 
 Kai Liu, Yongchang Wang, Daniel L. Lau, Qi Hao, Laurence G. Hassebrook: Gamma Model and its Analysis for Phase Measuring Profilometry. J. Opt. Soc. Am. A, 27: 553–562, 2010
 Yongchang Wang, Kai Liu, Daniel L. Lau, Qi Hao, Laurence G. Hassebrook: Maximum SNR Pattern Strategy for Phase Shifting Methods in Structured Light Illumination, J. Opt. Soc. Am. A, 27(9), pp. 1962–1971, 2010
 
 Hof, C., Hopermann, H.: Comparison of Replica- and In Vivo-Measurement of the Microtopography of Human Skin University of the Federal Armed Forces, Hamburg
 Frankowski, G., Chen, M., Huth, T.: Real-time 3D Shape Measurement with Digital Stripe Projection by Texas Instruments Micromirror Devices (DMD) Proc. SPIE-Vol. 3958(2000), pp. 90–106
 Frankowski, G., Chen, M., Huth, T.: Optical Measurement of the 3D-Coordinates and the Combustion Chamber Volume of Engine Cylinder Heads Proc. Of "Fringe 2001", pp. 593–598
 
 
 Elena Stoykova, Jana Harizanova, Venteslav Sainov: Pattern Projection Profilometry for 3D Coordinates Measurement of Dynamic Scenes. In: Three Dimensional Television, Springer, 2008, 
 Song Zhang, Peisen Huang: High-resolution, Real-time 3-D Shape Measurement (PhD Dissertation, Stony Brook Univ., 2005)
 Tao Peng: Algorithms and models for 3-D shape measurement using digital fringe projections (Ph.D. Dissertation, University of Maryland, USA. 2007)
 W. Wilke: Segmentierung und Approximation großer Punktwolken (Dissertation Univ. Darmstadt, 2000)
 G. Wiora: Optische 3D-Messtechnik Präzise Gestaltvermessung mit einem erweiterten Streifenprojektionsverfahren (Dissertation Univ. Heidelberg, 2001)
 Klaus Körner, Ulrich Droste: Tiefenscannende Streifenprojektion (DSFP)  University of Stuttgart (further English references on the site)
 R. Morano, C. Ozturk, R. Conn, S. Dubin, S. Zietz, J. Nissano, "Structured light using pseudorandom codes", IEEE Transactions on Pattern Analysis and Machine Intelligence 20 (3)(1998)322–327

Further reading 
 Fringe 2005, The 5th International Workshop on Automatic Processing of Fringe Patterns Berlin: Springer, 2006.  

3D imaging
Computer vision